Generalleutnant Kurt-Bertram von Döring (18 February 1889 in Ribbekardt – 9 July 1960 in Medingen) was a German World War II  Generalleutnant of Luftwaffe. He began his career as a flying ace in World War I, became a flying soldier of fortune during the 1920s and early 1930s, and then joined the resurgent German air service and served through World War II.

Early life

Born 18 February 1889 at Ribbekardt, Döring joined the Dragoon Regiment Nr. 17 on 14 March 1907. In mid 1913 he transferred to the Air Service, and in May 1914 joined Festung Flieger-Abteilung in Cologne.

World War I

In late 1914 he was assigned to Flieger-Abteilung 38, and was commissioned on 1 February 1915. Döring then served with Sonderstaffel Nr. 2 in 1916. An able administrative Officer and leader, as well as being considered a steady and reliable pilot, meant after service with Flieger-Abteilung (Artillerie) 227 Döring took command of Jagdstaffel 4 on 8 April 1917, before he had claimed an air victory. However, he scored his first victory a few days later, on 14 April 1917; he continued to collect wins through 4 October, when he scored his eleventh and last. On 14 December 1917, he was awarded the Royal House Order of Hohenzollern to accompany his Iron Cross First Class.

Döring also gained the trust of Jagdgeschwader 1 commander Rittmeister Manfred von Richthofen, who assigned command of Jagdgeschwader 1 to Döring when Richthofen was away from the front.

Promoted to Rittmeister on 28 November 1917, Döring remained in command of Jagdstaffel 4 until 19 January 1918, after which he took over Jagdgruppe Nr. 4. In August he took over Jagdstaffel 66, and then a few days later Jagdstaffel 1.

Between the world wars

He rejoined the Dragoons on 1 December 1918. He became an advisor with the Argentinian Air Force from 1923–1927 and the Peruvian Air Force until 1929. From 1930 to 1932, he was a member of the German aviation mission to China.

Döring rejoined the Luftwaffe on 1 July 1934, as a major. He commanded the flying School at Celle in 1936, and became a Gruppenkommandeur of JG 2. He commanded the Horst Wessel Squadron in April 1936.

World War II and after
iFrom 15 December 1939 to 1 December 1940 he was a major general commanding Jagdfliegerführer 2. From August 1941 through January 1942, he was a Jagd Division commander with the rank of lieutenant general (Generalleutnant), his seniority dating from 1 November 1941.

Döring died on 9 July 1960 at Medingen, administrative district of Uelzen, Lower-Saxony, Germany.

Awards
 Iron Cross (1914) 2nd and 1st Class
 House Order of Hohenzollern (26 November 1917)
 Clasp to the Iron Cross (1939) 2nd and 1st Class
 German Cross in Gold on 30 December 1942 as Generalleutnant in the 1. Jagd-Division

References
Citations

Bibliography

 Franks, Norman R. L.; et al. (1993). Above the Lines: The Aces and Fighter Units of the German Air Service, Naval Air Service and Flanders Marine Corps 1914 – 1918 Grub Street. , .
 

1889 births
1960 deaths
German World War I flying aces
Lieutenant generals of the Luftwaffe
Luftstreitkräfte personnel
Luftwaffe World War II generals
People from Gryfice County
People from the Province of Pomerania
Peruvian military personnel
Recipients of the Gold German Cross
Recipients of the clasp to the Iron Cross, 1st class